The DFB-Pokal 2015–16 was the 36th season of the cup competition, Germany's second-most important title in women's football.

Results

First round
The draw for the first round was held on 14 July 2015, it was divided into a Northern and Southern draw. The top seven teams from the last Bundesliga season received a bye to the second round.

Second round
The draw for the second round took place on 27 August 2015. The 25 teams which advanced from the first round were joined by the top seven teams from the last Bundesliga season (FC Bayern Munich, VfL Wolfsburg, FFC Frankfurt, FFC Turbine Potsdam, SGS Essen, TSG Hoffenheim and SC Freiburg).

Round of 16
The draw for the Round of 16 was held on 10 October 2015.

Quarterfinals
The quarterfinals draw took place on 15 November 2015. FC Lübars is the only remaining team not playing in the Bundesliga, being part of the 2. Bundesliga.

Semifinals
The semifinals draw took place on 16 December 2015.

Final

Topscorers

References

Women
Pok
2015-16